Bredstedt (North Frisian: Bräist) is a town in the district of Nordfriesland, in Schleswig-Holstein, Germany. It is situated near the North Sea coast, approximately 20 km northwest of Husum.

Notable people
Christian Albrecht Jensen (1792–1870), portrait painter who depicted most of the leading figures of the Danish Golden Age
Hans Carl Knudtzon (1751–1823) emigrated to Norway and became a merchant, ship-owner and politician.

References

Nordfriesland